Annetta Mary Carter (June 28 1907 – May 8, 1991) was an American botanist.

Early life 
Carter was born on June 28, 1907, in Sierra Madre, California. After the death of her mother, Carter's father spent the summers working in the San Gabriel Mountains as a fire guard, giving Carter the freedom to explore her surroundings and develop an appreciation for nature. Her interest in botany was encouraged and supported by her botany teacher at Pasadena High School.

Education and career
In 1928, Carter enrolled in the Botany program at the University of California in Berkeley. She graduated in 1930 with her A.B. in Botany. Her graduating class consisted on 7 women, including Mary L. Bowerman. Carter went on to pursue her master's degree with a focus in the morphology of floating liverwort. Her studies during the program were supervised by William Albert Setchell.

After receiving her M.A. in 1932, Carter went on to work at the University of California, Berkeley Herbarium where she began as a mounter. She remained with the herbarium under the title Principal Herbarium Botanist until her retirement in 1968. Despite having officially retired, Carter continued to assist the herbarium as a Research Associate. Whilst employed at the herbarium, Carter began collecting throughout California.

Personal life and death
Carter died in Berkeley on May 8, 1991, at the age of 83.

References

1907 births
1991 deaths
American botanists
UC Berkeley College of Natural Resources alumni
American women botanists